Goodrich High School may refer to:
 Goodrich High School (Texas)
 Goodrich High School (Michigan) - Goodrich Area Schools
 Goodrich High School (North Dakota) - Goodrich School District 16 (closed in 2020)